György Molnár (12 February 1901 – 25 January 1977) was a Hungarian footballer who began his career in Hungary before finishing it in the American Soccer League.

Club career
Molnár began his career with MTK Hungária FC in the Hungarian League.  In 1927, he moved to the United States where he signed with the New York Giants of the American Soccer League.  He spent only one season with New York before moving to the Brooklyn Hakoah for the fall 1929 season.  Following that season, Molnar transferred to the Brooklyn Wanderers where he finished his career.

National team
Molnar earned twenty-seven caps with the Hungarian national team, scoring eleven goals.

References

External links
Hungarian national team goal scoring list

1901 births
1977 deaths
Jewish Hungarian sportspeople
Jewish footballers
Hungarian footballers
Hungarian expatriate footballers
Hungary international footballers
MTK Budapest FC players
American Soccer League (1921–1933) players
New York Giants (soccer) players
Brooklyn Hakoah players
Brooklyn Wanderers players
HŠK Građanski Zagreb managers
Olympic footballers of Hungary
Footballers at the 1924 Summer Olympics
Expatriate football managers in Yugoslavia
Association football forwards
Hungarian expatriate sportspeople in the United States
Expatriate soccer players in the United States
Hungarian football managers